Sune Waldimir (15 November 1907 – 9 December 1967) was a Swedish composer known particularly for his film scores.

Selected filmography
 Kanske en gentleman (1935)
 The Boys of Number Fifty Seven (1935)
 The Lady Becomes a Maid (1936)
 The Girls of Uppakra (1936)
 Poor Millionaires (1936)
 Life Begins Today (1939)
 Oh, What a Boy! (1939)
 The Sixth Shot (1943)
 Som folk är mest (1944)
 Dolly Takes a Chance (1944)
 Fram för lilla Märta (1945)
 Jolanta the Elusive Pig (1945)
 The Österman Brothers' Virago (1945)
 Kungliga patrasket (1945)
 Money (1946)
 Desire (1946)
 The Balloon (1946)
The Key and the Ring (1947)
 No Way Back (1947)
 Song of Stockholm (1947)
 Two Women (1947)
 Lilla Märta kommer tillbaka (1948)
 Private Bom (1948)
 The Girl from the Third Row (1949)
 Playing Truant (1949)
 The Motor Cavaliers (1950)
 Andersson's Kalle (1950)
 The Nuthouse (1951)
 My Friend Oscar (1951)
 Resan till dej (1953)
 Young Summer (1954)
 Laugh Bomb (1954)
 Galapagos (1955)
 Darling of Mine (1955)
 Mother Takes a Vacation (1957)
 The Koster Waltz (1958)

References

Bibliography
 Klossner, Michael. The Europe of 1500-1815 on Film and Television: A Worldwide Filmography of Over 2550 Works, 1895 Through 2000. McFarland & Company, 2002.
 Petrucci, Antonio. Twenty Years of Cinema in Venice. International Exhibition of Cinematographic Art, 1952.

External links

1907 births
1967 deaths
Swedish composers
People from Västerås